A hostess is a female host or presenter of an event.

Hostess may also refer to:

Hospitality trades 
 Air hostess, a flight attendant
 A female maître d' at a restaurant
 An employee at a hostess club
 Bargirl, a paid, female companion offering conversation and, in some cases, sex	
 Taxi dancer, a paid, female dancing partner

Product brands 
 Hostess Brands, a U.S.-based bakery company formed in 2013
 Hostess Potato Chips, a former Canadian brand owned by Frito-Lay
 Hostess Entertainment, Japanese music company
 Hostess (snack cakes), a brand of snack cakes owned by Hostess Brands

Other 
 "Hostess" (short story), by American writer Isaac Asimov
 Hostess House, a 1918 house in Palo Alto, California, U.S.
 The Hostess, a 1995 episode 43 of British television series Keeping Up Appearances
"Hostess", song by Rudimental from Ground Control, 2021

See also 
 Host (disambiguation)